The State of Palestine has an embassy in Montevideo. The Oriental Republic of Uruguay has an embassy in Ramallah. Uruguay recognized the State of Palestine in 2011, without specifically recognizing borders. There is a small Palestinian population in Uruguay, numbering a few thousands.

See also
 Foreign relations of Palestine
 Foreign relations of Uruguay
 Palestinian Uruguayans

References 

 
Bilateral relations of Uruguay
Uruguay